Shanta Devarajan is Senior Director for Development Economics (DEC) and a former Acting Chief Economist of the World Bank Group.

He previously served as Chief Economist of the World Bank’s Middle East and North Africa Region, Principal Economist and Research Manager for Public Economics in the Development Research Group, and the Chief Economist of the Human Development Network, the South Asia Region and Africa Region. He co-directed the World Development Report 2004.

Before 1991, he was a faculty member at Harvard University’s John F. Kennedy School of Government. His research covers public economics, natural resources and the environment, and general equilibrium modeling of developing countries, and he is the author or co-author of more than 100 publications.

Selected works
 Ames, Brian, Ward Brown, Shanta Devarajan, and Alejandro Izquierdo. "Macroeconomic policy and poverty reduction." (2001).
 Devarajan, Shanta, Stuti Khemani, and Shekar Shah. "The politics of partial decentralization." Does decentralization enhance service delivery and poverty reduction (2009): 102-121.
 Devarajan, Shanta, Jeffrey D. Lewis, and Sherman Robinson. "Getting the model right: The general equilibrium approach to adjustment policy." World Bank and International Food Policy Research Institute, Washington, DC Photocopy (1994).

References

20th-century Indian economists
21st-century Indian economists
Living people
Sri Lankan Hindus
World Bank Chief Economists
Year of birth missing (living people)